A patriotic song is a song with strong patriotic content.

"The Patriotic Song" may refer to the national anthem of some countries:

"Aegukga", the national anthem of South Korea
"Aegukka", the national anthem of North Korea
"Korean Empire Aegukga", the former national anthem of Korea 
"Patrioticheskaya Pesnya", the national anthem of Russia from 1990 to 2000

See also 
 :Category:Lists of patriotic songs
 :Category:American patriotic songs